Pycnarmon geminipuncta is a moth in the family Crambidae. It was described by George Hampson in 1912. It is found in China.

References

Spilomelinae
Moths described in 1912
Moths of Asia